I'm Staying is a 2007 Russian comedy-drama film, directorial debut of Karen Oganesyan.

Plot
Dr. Tyrsa treats people with the usual medical methods and is irritated when people want to discuss with him the otherworldly, afterlife and communication with the deceased. The only thing that really can touch his heart is the fate of his only daughter who is unrequitedly in love with her boss. It is because of her that the doctor gets in trouble: as a result of being hit on the head with a bowling ball, he falls into a coma – the state between life and death. From this moment on his views on the world change significantly. Having met other people in the other world who are also in a coma, he becomes more humane, wise and tolerant. This helps him to return to life, protect his daughter from the encroachments of a cynical suitor and help her to find true love.

Cast 
 Andrey Krasko as Victor Tyrsa
 Fyodor Bondarchuk as Instructor
 Andrey Sokolov as Gleb Shahov
 Elena Yakovleva as Natalia Tyrsa
 Nelli Uvarova as Evgeniya Tyrsa
 Yelena Bondarchuk as Anna
 Evgeny Zharikov as doctor Oleg Saprunov

References

External links 

2007 comedy-drama films
2007 films
Russian comedy-drama films
2000s Russian-language films